Morrison Chapel, also known as Morrison Protestant Chapel, is an Anglican chapel situated in Luís de Camões Square, Santo António, Macau. Originally built in the early 19th century to serve the spiritual needs of the employees of East India Company, the chapel now serves the worshipers with a variety of denominational backgrounds in the Missionary Area of Macau. The present Chapel was built in 1922.

History
Traders of East India Company were engaged in trade with China from the late 18th century until 1834. Their charter includes stipulations that employees of the company should be allowed to attend religious services on a regular basis and chaplains should be sent out from England to take care of the spiritual needs of employees.

Before 1821, when the land for a chapel and burial ground (now the Old Protestant Cemetery) was purchased, the chapel was probably simply a room at the offices of the British East India Company.  The purchase of the burial ground was prompted by the death of Mary Morrison, wife of Robert Morrison, missionary and translator employed by the East India Company.  Prior to this, the Portuguese authorities had only allowed Roman Catholic burials in the colony.

Nothing is known about the construction of the first chapel at the site.  The first recorded ceremony at the chapel was a marriage in 1833.

In 1834, when the East India Company lost its trade monopoly, responsibility for the chapel and cemetery was taken by the British government.  In 1870 this responsibility was transferred by Deed of Transfer to Trustees consisting of three high ranking representatives of at least two nations having Protestant members living in Macau.

In 1921 the Chapel required complete rebuilding, except for the original foundation.  Two conditions were placed on these works; it had to be hidden from the street behind a high wall, and it could have no church bell.  The chapel has remained structurally unaltered since the completion of these works in 1922.

In 1941 the congregation was swollen in numbers by refugees fleeing the Second Sino-Japanese War. The Japanese occupation of Hong Kong and of parts of China had made it impossible for Anglican priests to get to neutral Macau, where there was no resident Anglican priest; Florence Li Tim-Oi, the deaconess in charge of the chapel, was authorised by Bishop Ronald Hall and his assistant to give the sacraments to the Anglicans in these extenuating circumstances. On 25 January 1944 she was ordained 'a Priest of God' by Bishop Hall, thus became the first female priest in the worldwide Anglican Communion.

See also
 Religion in Macau
 Missionary Area of Macau
 Hong Kong Sheng Kung Hui
 List of Anglican churches in Macau
 Anglican Communion

References

External links

 Missionary Area of Macau
 Morrison Chapel

1922 establishments in Macau
Anglican church buildings in Asia
Churches completed in 1922
Churches in Macau
Historic Centre of Macau
Macau Peninsula
Properties of the East India Company
Tourist attractions in Macau
Chapels in China